Benchmark Electronics Inc is an EMS, ODM, and OEM company based in Tempe, Arizona in the Phoenix metropolitan area. It provides contract manufacturing services.

History
Initially a subsidiary of Intermedics, a medical implant manufacturer, Benchmark was sold to Electronic Investors Corporation in 1986.

The company made an IPO in 1990.

In 2007 Benchmark Electronics acquired Pemstar Inc, another contract manufacturer.

In December 2011, founder and chairman Cary Fu promoted Gayla Delly to CEO in December 2011.

On September 16, 2016, Benchmark named Paul J. Tufano president and chief executive officer, effective immediately. He replaced Gayla Delly, who had been with Benchmark since 1996.

Tufano stepped down from his position as president and CEO on March 18, 2019 and is replaced by Jeff Benck.

Benchmark ranked as the 18th largest EMS/ODM company worldwide in the CIRCUITS ASSEMBLY Top 50 for 2019.

In June 2020, the company announced plans to shutter its factory in Angleton, TX.

Customers
Benchmark Electronics's customers have included Sun Microsystems, Medtronic, EMC Corporation, iRobot, and Silicon Graphics.

Services
While basic computing-related products made up the majority of its earlier product lines, the company also manufactures telecommunications equipment and medical devices. Benchmark has also expanded its business into precision technologies, providing extensive precision mechanical manufacturing capabilities.

Production bases and facilities
Benchmark Electronics has operations in eight countries and has 24 sites.

The company has production bases in Almelo, Netherlands; Angleton, TX; Bangkok, Thailand; Brasov, Romania; Guadalajara, Mexico; Tempe, Arizona; Tijuana, Mexico; Huntsville, AL; Penang, Malaysia; Nashua, NH; Singapore; Suzhou, China.; and Winona & Rochester, MN.

References

External links

Official website

Companies listed on the New York Stock Exchange
Electronics companies of the United States